Pett is a village in East Sussex, England.

Pett may also refer to:

People
 Pett dynasty, English shipbuilding family of the 15th–17th centuries
 Peter Pett (1610–1672), shipwright, commissioner of Chatham Dockyard
 Peter Pett (lawyer) (1630–1699), lawyer and author
 Peter Pett (shipwright) (died 1589), shipwright at Deptford
 Phineas Pett (1570–1647), shipwright, commissioner of Chatham Dockyard

 Joel Pett (born 1953), American cartoonist
 John Pett (1927–2021), British film director/producer
 Lionel Bradley Pett (1909–2003), Canadian biochemist and nutritionist
 Lynn Pett (1940–2017), mayor of Murray, Utah, United States
 Martin Pett (born 1986), German footballer
 Norman Pett (1891–1960), English cartoonist
 Oliver Pett (born 1988), English squash player
 Phineas Pett (priest) (1756–1830), Archdeacon of Oxford
 Sarah Pett, Professor of Infectious Diseases, University College London
 Tom Pett (born 1991), English footballer
 William Pett (1873–1954), British cyclist

Other
 Kamchatka Time, a timezone abbreviated to PETT
 Pett Productions, British media production company

See also
 Pett Bottom (disambiguation)